Mohammad Aslam is an Indian politician.  He was elected in March 2017 as a Member of the Legislative Assembly from the Bhinga (Assembly constituency).

References

Living people
Uttar Pradesh MLAs 2017–2022
Bahujan Samaj Party politicians from Uttar Pradesh
1965 births